Mayor General FAP Armando Revoredo Iglesias Airport , known in Spanish as Aeropuerto Mayor General FAP Armando Revoredo Iglesias (with Mayor General often abbreviated as My. Gral.), is an airport serving Cajamarca, capital of the Cajamarca Region in Peru. It is run by CORPAC S.A. (Corporación Peruana de Aeropuertos y Aviación Comercial S.A.), a government organization that oversees management of Peruvian airports.

The runway has high terrain to the north.

The Cajamarca non-directional beacon (Ident: MAR) is located on the field.

Airlines and destinations

See also
Transport in Peru
List of airports in Peru

References

External links 

OpenStreetMap - Cajamarca
OurAirports - Cajamarca
SkyVector Aeronautical Charts

Airports in Peru
Buildings and structures in Cajamarca Region
Cajamarca